Noh Hee-kyung (born March 21, 1966) is a South Korean television screenwriter and essayist.

Career 
Noh Hee-kyung has become renowned in South Korea for her realistic, cerebral and in-depth portrayals of the lives and relationships of ordinary people.

Early works, motherhood as theme 
Noh said she wrote The Most Beautiful Goodbye in the World (1996) two years after the death of her own mother, as a tribute to her. The drama is about a devoted mother in her sixties whose family has always taken her for granted. But when they learn she has been diagnosed with a terminal illness and doesn't have much time left to live, they all come together for the first time to give her the support they've always denied her. With heart-wrenching dialogue and meaty performances from Na Moon-hee and Joo Hyun, the TV series instantly brought fame to Noh. The story of a dying mother resonated with viewers and critics alike, winning the Grand Prize for TV ("Daesang") and Best TV Drama at the 1997 Baeksang Arts Awards. After a 1997 novelization, Noh adapted the drama into a stage play in 2010, which starred Jung Ae-ri and Song Ok-sook in the lead role. In 2011, director Min Kyu-dong made a film adaptation titled The Last Blossom.

Noh continued writing television dramas. Lie (1998), which started the "mania drama" trend (Korean slang for low ratings but big cult following online), is about a couple played by Lee Sung-jae and Yoo Ho-jeong who are unable to have children, and Bae Jong-ok as the woman who comes between them. In Did We Really Love? (1999), Bae Yong-joon struggles between the choice of love or materialism, represented by Kim Hye-soo and Yoon Son-ha. Sad Temptation (1999) was the first to feature a gay couple on Korean TV, played by Kim Kap-soo and Joo Jin-mo. Foolish Love (2000), starring Lee Jae-ryong and Bae Jong-ok, competed in the same timeslot as massive hit Hur Jun, and thus became one of the lowest-rated Korean dramas in history, at around 1%. Solitude (2002) dealt with a single mother (Lee Mi-sook) who is pursued by a younger man (Ryoo Seung-bum) 15 years her junior.

In More Beautiful Than a Flower (2004), Noh explored the many facets of family love when a mother (the "flower" of the title, played by Go Doo-shim) is diagnosed with dementia. The drama received several awards at the 2004 KBS Drama Awards, including Best Writer for Noh, and the Grand Prize ("Daesang") for Go. It also won Best TV Drama at the 2004 Baeksang Arts Awards.

Urban melodramas 
Goodbye Solo (2006) is an urban melodrama with an ensemble of seven main characters of different generations and backgrounds: a bartender (Chun Jung-myung), an artist (Yoon So-yi), a gangster (Lee Jae-ryong), a restaurant owner (Kim Min-hee), a secretary (Kim Nam-gil), a divorcee (Bae Jong-ok), and a mute old lady (Na Moon-hee). All feeling alienated because of pain in their past, they gradually interact and form a "family" borne out of emotional connection and mutual understanding. Noh said that the story unfolds to one common theme: that everyone is beautiful just the way they are. Known for her distinctive and striking dialogue, Noh poured many of her personal stories into the show, including her own experience with her mother. The drama is also notable for reinventing the career of actress Kim Min-hee. Previously known as a bad actress, Kim was a big fan of Noh's, and she campaigned for a role, despite getting rejected by Noh five times. But on the sixth time, Noh saw the actress's determination and hidden potential that made her right for the character Mi-ri. Despite cries of miscasting from drama fans, Kim went through strict acting training and character analysis, showing vast improvement in her performance and making the first steps towards her eventual transformation into a real actress.

Noh then wrote several short dramas. In the four-episode Miracle (2006), Jang Yong played a man who reassesses his life after learning that he's in the final stages of lung cancer. While in Several Questions That Make Us Happy (2007), three stories unfold in omnibus format over two episodes.

She reunited with director Pyo Min-soo (they had previously worked together on Lie, Sad Temptation, Foolish Love and Solitude) in The World That They Live In (also known as Worlds Within, 2008), about the hectic lives of a drama production team. Hyun Bin and Song Hye-kyo played TV directors who rekindle their romantic relationship. According to Song, after she and Pyo wrapped her last drama Full House in 2004, they had promised to work together with Noh. Song said, "I was their fan and so I had no reason to say no. Noh's writing is so good, it makes playing my role a challenge. It is hard to pull off natural and realistic acting." Noh, for her part, said she "relied a bit more on the actors and was able to express myself more freely."

Essays 
In 2008, Noh published a collection of essays titled Everyone Not in Love Now Are Guilty. It became a bestseller. The book was divided into four sections with varying themes, namely: "Life is too difficult to concentrate only on love"; "The thing that love demands first, before trust or tears"; "If I could hold all of life and people in my eyes"; "When they were lonely, what did we do?". The essays contained Noh's reflections on life and love, dramas and actresses she's worked with, and the topic of her mother, who has been the most important driving influence in Noh's life.

Revival of single-episode dramas 
After the single-episode anthology series Drama City was cancelled in 2008, TV writers and directors clamored for its revival. And in 2010, the now-renamed Drama Special aired its first episode, Red Candy, which was written by Noh. It starred Lee Jae-ryong as a forty-something married man going through a midlife crisis, who falls for a younger woman (Park Si-yeon) he sees everyday on the subway always carrying a red lollipop. Park said of Noh, "I felt that I had to be in whatever she writes."

Cable debut and ratings success 
Noh then wrote Padam Padam, her first melodrama with fantasy elements. It was also her first to be aired on cable television, since Padam Padam was one of the inaugural dramas of jTBC in late 2011. Jung Woo-sung played the leading role of a man recently released from prison after serving a 16-year sentence for a crime he didn't commit. Noh said she had underestimated Jung as merely "a handsome actor who brightens your mood," but changed her mind after meeting him in person, calling him a "genuine actor." Deeply moved by Noh's previous drama More Beautiful than a Flower, Jung said he had "always wanted to be part of her work but have never had the chance to do so. This character fell into my lap one day, whether by coincidence or destiny." Supporting actor Kim Bum said that after acting the range of emotions his character goes through, he cultivated a stronger respect and gratitude towards Noh.

In 2013, Song Hye-kyo and Kim Bum again joined Noh's next drama, That Winter, the Wind Blows. Instead of an original script, Noh adapted the 2002 Japanese drama . Song starred opposite Jo In-sung, who played a gambler whose survival depends on pulling off the ultimate con ― pretending to be his deceased friend so that the friend's blind sister will hand over her inheritance to him. Unlike most of Noh's dramas, Winter received solid ratings and was number one in its timeslot for 8 straight weeks. But it also disappointed her longtime fans, who criticized the drama for not being realistic and overly focusing on "pretty" imagery.

Noh worked with Jo In-sung again in 2014's It's Okay, That's Love, which also reunited her with Gong Hyo-jin, who had previously starred in Noh's Wonderful Days (2001). This was Noh's fourth collaboration with director Kim Kyu-tae, after Worlds Within, Padam Padam, and That Winter, the Wind Blows. Kim said he and Noh wanted to make a drama that challenged social prejudice against the mentally ill, through the love story of a schizophrenic mystery novelist and a sexually phobic psychiatrist. Noh wrote a letter to the cast and crew on their last read-through that said, "During the rehearsals, we cried and laughed. Because I felt a bit sad about the time left with the team, I forgot about the pain of creativity and wanted to write a couple more episodes." Despite lackluster TV ratings, It's Okay, That's Love drew critical praise and ranked third on the Content Power Index (CPI monitors non-traditional variables such as number of mobile and Internet streaming viewers and online "buzz" in social media). It also kickstarted a micro-trend of Korean dramas with themes involving mental illness, such as Kill Me, Heal Me and Hyde, Jekyll, Me.

in October 2021, Noh announced her latest project Our Blues set in Jeju Island is about three couples, has star studied cast include Lee Byung-hun

Other activities 
Noh is close to Pomnyun, a Buddhist monk well known for his involvement in humanitarian issues. They are both active in Join Together Society (JTS Korea), an international relief group which donates to third-world countries and North Korea.

TV series 

Our Blues (tvN, 2022)
Live (tvN, 2018)
The Most Beautiful Goodbye (tvN, 2017)
Dear My Friends (tvN, 2016)
It's Okay, That's Love (SBS, 2014)
That Winter, the Wind Blows (SBS, 2013)
Padam Padam (jTBC, 2011–2012)
Drama Special "Red Candy" (KBS2, 2010)
Worlds Within (KBS2, 2008)
Several Questions That Make Us Happy (KBS2, 2007)
Miracle (MBC, 2006)
Goodbye Solo (KBS2, 2006)
Becoming a Popular Song  (KBS2, 2005)
More Beautiful Than a Flower (KBS2, 2004)
Solitude (KBS2, 2002)
Wonderful Days (SBS, 2001–2002)
Like Rain (SBS, 2000)
Foolish Love (KBS2, 2000)
Sad Temptation (KBS2, 1999)
Did We Really Love? (MBC, 1999)
Lie (KBS2, 1998)
It's Still Time to Love (KBS2, 1997)
The Reason I Live (MBC, 1997)
The Most Beautiful Goodbye in the World (MBC, 1996)
MBC Best Theater "Sallie and Suzie" (MBC, 1996)
Mom's Gardenias (1995)

Playwright 
The Most Beautiful Goodbye in the World (2010)

Book 
Everyone Not in Love Now Are Guilty (essays, 2008)

Awards 
2022 Seoul Institute of the Arts : Light of Life award  
2017 53rd Baeksang Arts Awards: Best Screenplay (Dear My Friends)
2005 11th Shanghai Television Festival: Best Screenplay (Becoming a Popular Song)
2005 17th Korea Broadcasting Producers' Awards: Best Drama Writer (More Beautiful Than a Flower)
2004 17th Korea Broadcasting Scriptwriters' Awards: Best Drama Writer (More Beautiful Than a Flower)
2004 KBS Drama Awards: Best Writer (More Beautiful Than a Flower)
1999 KBS Drama Awards: Best Writer
1999 35th Baeksang Arts Awards: Best TV Screenplay (Lie)
1997 MBC Drama Awards: Best Writer (The Most Beautiful Goodbye in the World)
1995 MBC Best Theater Competition: Excellence in Writing

State honors

Notes

Frequent collaborators 
Bae Jong-ok, actress
Pyo Min-soo, director
Na Moon-hee, actress
Lee Jae-ryong, actor
Youn Yuh-jung, actress
Kim Kyu-chul, actor
Kim Kyu-tae, director

References

External links 
Noh Hee-kyung blog at Naver 

English translations of Noh Hee-kyung's essays Everyone Not in Love Now Are Guilty

Living people
South Korean screenwriters
Seoul Institute of the Arts alumni
1966 births
South Korean television writers
South Korean Buddhists